Tallgrass Interstate Gas Transmission (TIGT) is a  natural gas pipeline system in the US states of Nebraska, Colorado, Kansas, Missouri, and Wyoming.

References

External links
map

Natural gas pipelines in the United States
Natural gas pipelines in Nebraska
Natural gas pipelines in Colorado
Natural gas pipelines in Kansas
Natural gas pipelines in Missouri
Natural gas pipelines in Wyoming